Jezreel Valley Regional Council (Mo'atza Azorit Emek Yizra'el) is a regional council in northern Israel that encompasses most of the settlements in the Jezreel Valley. It includes 15 kibbutzim, 15 moshavim, 6 community settlements and two Bedouin villages. Despite its name, some of these settlements are not located in the Jezreel Valley proper, but in the vicinity.

List of communities

Kibbutzim
Alonim
Dovrat
Ein Dor
Gazit
Gevat
Ginegar
Hanaton
Harduf
HaSolelim
Kfar HaHoresh
Merhavia
Mizra
Ramat David
Sarid
Yifat
Moshavim
Alonei Abba
Alon HaGalil
Balfouria
Beit She'arim (moshav)
Beit Zeid
Bethlehem of Galilee
HaYogev
Kfar Barukh
Kfar Gidon
Kfar Yehoshua
Merhavia
Nahalal
Sde Ya'akov
Tel Adashim
Zippori
Community settlements
Adi
Ahuzat Barak
Givat Ela
Hoshaya
Shimshit
Timrat
Arab villages
Manshiya Zabda
Suweid Hamira

References

External links
Official website 

 
Regional councils in Northern District (Israel)